Acanthocercus cyanocephalus, Falk's blue-headed tree agama, is a species of lizard in the family Agamidae. It is a small lizard found in Angola, Namibia, Zambia, and Democratic Republic of the Congo.

References

Acanthocercus
Reptiles described in 1925
IUCN Red List least concern species